Appuldurcombe House (also spelt Appledorecombe or Appledore Combe) is the shell of a large 18th-century English Baroque country house of the Worsley family. The house is situated near to Wroxall on the Isle of Wight, England. It is now managed by English Heritage and is open to the public. A small part of the  estate that once surrounded it is still intact, but other features of the estate are still visible in the surrounding farmland and nearby village of Wroxall, including the entrance to the park, the Freemantle Gate, now used only by farm animals and pedestrians.

History

Appuldurcombe began as a priory in 1100. It became a convent, then the Elizabethan home of the Leigh family. The large Tudor mansion was bequeathed in 1690 to Sir Robert Worsley, 3rd Baronet, who began planning a suitable replacement. Of the existing property, he wrote:

1702: Baroque mansion

The present house was begun in 1702. The architect was John James. Sir Robert never saw the house fully completed. He died on 29 July 1747, in his memory a monument was erected overlooking the house on Stenbury Down.

The house was greatly extended in the 1770s by his great-nephew Sir Richard Worsley, 7th Baronet Worsley of Appuldurcombe. The newly extended mansion was where Sir Richard brought his new wife, the 17-year-old Seymour Dorothy Fleming, whom he married "for love and £80,000". Capability Brown was commissioned in 1779 to design the ornamental grounds at the same time as the extensions. A romantic ruined folly known as "Cooke’s Castle" was built on the hill opposite to improve the view. During Sir Richard's time, the house held a magnificent art collection and was the setting for Sir Richard's entertaining of some of the most eminent figures of the age.

Sir Richard's marriage quickly fell apart, and the couple's only child, a son, died in infancy. After he sued one of his wife's rumoured 27 lovers, the couple informally separated. Seymour could not remarry until Richard's death, and she became a professional mistress or demimondaine, living off the donations of rich men in order to survive, joining other upper-class women in a similar position in the New Female Coterie. Sir Richard died of apoplexy on 8 August 1805 at Appledurcombe, and was buried at the parish church at Godshill. His title passed to his fourth cousin, Henry Worsley-Holmes, whilst his wife's £70,000 jointure reverted to her, and just over a month later she remarried.

Worsley had left the estate saddled with heavy debts, but Appuldurcombe passed to his niece, Henrietta Anna Maria Charlotte (daughter of John Bridgeman Simpson). She married the Hon. Charles Anderson-Pelham, later first Earl of Yarborough, in 1806. The founder of the Royal Yacht Squadron at Cowes, he made few changes to the house and was quite happy to retain the property as a convenient base for his sailing activities.

In 1855 the estate was sold. An unsuccessful business venture ran Appuldurcombe as a hotel, but with its failure, the house was then leased as Dr Pound's Academy for young gentlemen. 

The house was inhabited in 1901–1907 by a hundred Benedictine monks who had been exiled from Solesmes Abbey in France and were shortly to settle at Quarr Abbey on the Isle of Wight.

Second World War: damage
Troops were billeted in the house during both world wars, and at the onset of the Second World War the house was taken over by the military. On 7 February 1943, a German Luftwaffe Dornier Do 217 that was engaged in a mine-laying mission turned inland and dropped its final mine very close to the house, before crashing into St Martin's Down. The mine exploded, blowing in windows and causing the collapse of part of the roof. The resulting hole in the roof was left unrepaired, and after the war much of the remainder of the roof and the interiors were removed and sold off.

Present

Although the house is now mainly a shell, its front section has been re-roofed and glazed, and a small part of the interior recreated. The house has become well known as one of the supposedly most haunted places on the island. There are frequent tales and claimed sightings of ghosts, phantoms and other supernatural phenomena. During the summer holidays, weekly ghost walks are held at Appuldurcombe every Thursday evening. 

As of January 2016, Appuldurcombe House and surrounding estate are for sale for £4.75 million.

References

External links

Appuldurcombe House website
English Heritage – Appuldurcombe House

Monasteries in the Isle of Wight
English Heritage sites in the Isle of Wight
English Baroque architecture
Grade I listed buildings on the Isle of Wight
Reportedly haunted locations in South East England
Country houses on the Isle of Wight
John James (architect) buildings
Gardens by Capability Brown